St. Augustine's Church is located at 290 Henry Street between Montgomery and Jackson Streets on the Lower East Side of Manhattan, New York City.

In 2021, it reported 46 members, average attendance of 22, and $62,280 in plate and pledge income.

History
The church began in 1819 as a mission near the old Grand Street Ferry run by students of the General Theological Seminary. Led by former mayor, Marinus Willett, the mission grew. It was organized as a parish in 1824, and construction began on All Saints' Free Church ("Free" meaning free of pew rent), around 1827. It was built of Manhattan schist. Around this time "Mount Pitt" (also known as Jones Hill), near Pitt and Grand Streets, was being leveled, and some of field stone used was taken from there. 

The design – a Georgian structure with Gothic windows – is credited to John Heath, and includes a double pediment and a projecting tower. The church was consecrated in 1828 by Bishop John Henry Hobart. Edgar Allan Poe used to attend on occasion during the church's early years.

Traditionally, it is thought that two rough galleries on either side of the organ loft might have been for the use of slaves, despite the church having been built after slaves were emancipated in New York. The building was enlarged in 1848 with the addition of a sanctuary and a chancel.

In 1949, the congregation merged with St. Augustine's Chapel of Trinity Church, then located at 107 East Houston Street, and the new combined congregation used the building on Henry Street. The parish became independent of Trinity in 1976.

The building became a New York City landmark in 1966, and was added to the National Register of Historic Places in 1980.

References

External links

Official website
St. Augustine's/All Saints records at Trinity Wall Street Archives

Churches completed in 1829
19th-century Episcopal church buildings
Churches in Manhattan
Episcopal church buildings in New York City
Properties of religious function on the National Register of Historic Places in Manhattan
Georgian Revival architecture in New York City
Federal architecture in New York City
Gothic Revival church buildings in New York City
Stone churches in New York City
Lower East Side